Zorgamazoo (2008) is Canadian children's author Robert Paul Weston's first novel. The work is a fantasy adventure, written entirely in rhyming anapestic tetrameter.

The story follows a young girl named Katrina Katrell, who runs away from home when her guardian threatens her with a lobotomy. Seeking shelter beneath the street, she meets Mortimer Yorgle, who belongs to a subterranean race of creatures called zorgles. Although he is ill-suited for the job, Mortimer has been sent to solve the mystery of what happened to the lost zorgles of Zorgamazoo.

The novel is a 2009 E.B. White Honor Book and won the California Young Reader Medal, the Children's Choice Award, and the Silver Birch Award from the Ontario Library Association. It was also named a top ten debut of 2008 by Booklist Magazine and a notable book of 2009 by the Children's Literature Assembly.

See also

Dust City

References
Booklist Top Ten of 2008
Booklist Review
Review in Canadian Children's Book News
Children's Literature Assembly 2009 Notable Books
Educating Alice, blogger review

External links
Zorgamazoo.com

2008 Canadian novels
Verse novels
Canadian children's novels
Children's fantasy novels
2008 children's books
2008 debut novels